James Dewey  was an English lawyer and politician who sat in the House of Commons from 1656 to 1659.

Dewey was the son and heir of James Dewey of Christchurch, Hampshire. He matriculated at Exeter College, Oxford on 20 November 1651 and was called to the bar at Middle Temple in 1656.  In 1656, he was elected Member of Parliament for Dorset in the Second Protectorate Parliament.  He was elected MP for Wareham in 1659 for the Third Protectorate Parliament.

References

Year of birth missing
Year of death missing
Members of the Middle Temple
Alumni of Exeter College, Oxford
Politicians from Dorset
17th-century English lawyers
English MPs 1656–1658
English MPs 1659